Bohumil Sládek is a Czechoslovak sprint canoeist who competed in the late 1930s. He won a bronze medal in the C-1 1000 m event at the 1938 ICF Canoe Sprint World Championships in Vaxholm, Sweden.

References

Czechoslovak male canoeists
Possibly living people
Year of birth missing
ICF Canoe Sprint World Championships medalists in Canadian